Bob Brookmeyer Plays Bob Brookmeyer and Some Others (also released as The Modernity of Bob Brookmeyer) is an album by jazz trombonist and pianist Bob Brookmeyer recorded in January 1955 for the Clef label.

Reception

The Allmusic review by Ken Dryden stated: "the valve trombonist was extremely busy in the studios (as both a leader and a sideman) at this point in his career, and he prolifically turned out top-notch arrangements such as the seven tracks on this record".

Track listing
All compositions by Bob Brookmeyer, except as indicated.
 "You Took Advantage of Me" (Richard Rodgers, Lorenz Hart) - 5:36
 "There Will Never Be Another You" (Harry Warren, Mack Gordon) - 4:25
 "What Is There to Say" (Vernon Duke, Yip Harburg) - 3:44
 "He Ain't Got Rhythm" (Irving Berlin) - 4:01
 "Jasmin" - 4:38
 "The Bulldog Blues" - 8:03
 "Sticks and Stems" - 5:34

Personnel 
Bob Brookmeyer - valve trombone
Jimmy Rowles - piano
Buddy Clark - bass
Mel Lewis - drums

References 

1955 albums
Clef Records albums
Verve Records albums
Bob Brookmeyer albums
Albums produced by Norman Granz